Xinjian Subdistrict is a subdistrict in Changyi District, Jilin City, Jilin province, China. , it has 3 residential communities under its administration.

See also 
 List of township-level divisions of Jilin

References 

Township-level divisions of Jilin
Jilin City